Lindenau may refer to:

Lindenau, Germany
Lindenau (Leipzig), a quarter of the city of Leipzig, Saxony, Germany
Lindenau, New Jersey, US
Lindenau, Texas, US, an unincorporated community
Lindenau (crater), a lunar crater

People with the surname
Bernhard von Lindenau, a 19th-century German astronomer